Turn Left Turn Right (Turn Left Turn Right – ) is a 2020 Thai television series adaptation of the illustrated book Turn Left, Turn Right (A Chance of Sunshine) by Taiwanese author Jimmy Liao, starring Kawee Tanjararak (Beam), Prachaya Ruangroj (Singto), Korapat Kirdpan (Nanon), Ornjira Lamwilai (Pang), Chayanit Chansangavej (Pat) and Napasorn Weerayuttvilai (Puimek).

Directed by Worrawech Danuwong and produced by GMMTV together with Lasercat Studio, the series was one of the thirteen television series launched by GMMTV in their "Wonder Th13teen" event on 5 November 2018. Originally scheduled for 2019 release, it premiered on GMM 25 and LINE TV on 2 February 2020, airing on Sundays at 21:30 ICT and 23:00 ICT, respectively. The series concluded on 5 April 2020.

Synopsis 
Tai (Korapat Kirdpan) dreams of being a sculptor but is torn with the wishes of his parents, who wants him to study marketing and his girlfriend Sangnuea (Wanwimol Jaenasavamethee), who wants him to study the same major with her. He has to choose between living up to others' expectation or his own dreams.

A young musician named Gun (Prachaya Ruangroj), who was waiting for his true love, crosses paths with Aye (Chayanit Chansangavej). While their relationship is going well, he encounters a choice of leaving his old life and moving to Taiwan with Aye.

All three of them faced with their own problem until they'd been brought to a mysterious bar, "Somewhere only we know". Its owner, Tor (Singto Numchok), offers them a second chance to turn back time for a new choice to either follow their heart or listen to their head. Whatever choice they make, their lives will never be the same.

Cast and characters
Below are the cast of the series:

Main 
 Kawee Tanjararak (Beam) as Pat
 Prachaya Ruangroj (Singto) as Gun
 Korapat Kirdpan (Nanon) as Tai
 Ornjira Lamwilai (Pang) as Trisha
 Chayanit Chansangavej (Pat) as Aye
 Napasorn Weerayuttvilai (Puimek) as Earn

Supporting 
 Phatchatorn Tanawat (Ploy) as Cher
 Wanwimol Jaenasavamethee (June) as Sangneua
 Singto Numchok as Tor
 Anusorn Maneeted (Young) as Gab
 Danai Jarujinda (Kik) as Jay
 Patara Eksangkul (Foei) as Sun
 Pattadon Janngeon (Fiat) as James
 Chayapol Jutamat (AJ)
 Napat Patcharachavalit

Guest role 
 Poramet Noi-um as Tai's father
 Mintita Wattanakul (Mint) as Nym
 Leo Saussay as Patrick
 Carissa Springett as Khim
 Supakan Benjaarruk (Nok) as Jessie

Soundtrack 
 "Second Chance" by Singto Numchok

Reception

Thailand television ratings 
In the table below,  represents the lowest ratings and  represents the highest ratings.

 Based on the average audience share per episode.

Awards and nominations

References

External links 
 Turn Left Turn Right on GMM 25 website 
 Turn Left Turn Right on LINE TV
 
 GMMTV

2020 Thai television series debuts
2020 Thai television series endings
Thai romantic drama television series
Thai fantasy television series
Television shows based on comic strips
GMM 25 original programming
Television series by GMMTV
Television series by Lasercat